Société française d'équipements pour la navigation aérienne or SFENA was a former French avionics company.

History
It was founded in 1947. It was disbanded in 1989. It made the flight control system (AFCS) for Concorde, as well as its artificial horizon and horizontal situation indicator (HSI), and automatic throttle system (ATS).

Ownership
It was merged with Crouzet in 1981, when Crouzet took its ownership from 35% to 85%.

Structure
It was headquartered at Neuilly-sur-Seine in Hauts-de-Seine (Île-de-France region) until 1970 when it moved to Vélizy-Villacoublay in a technical research centre near Vélizy – Villacoublay Air Base.

Products
It made guidance systems for aircraft including:
 Artificial horizons (attitude indicators or ADI)
 Horizontal situation indicators (HSI)
 Autopilots
 Flight controls (AFCS)
 Sensors

See also
 Smiths Industries, similar British company

References

External links
 Who built Concorde

French companies established in 1947
1989 disestablishments in France
Concorde
Aircraft component manufacturers of France
Aviation history of France
Avionics companies
Defunct manufacturing companies of France
Flight control system manufacturers
Manufacturing companies established in 1947
Manufacturing companies disestablished in 1989
Navigational equipment manufacturers
Neuilly-sur-Seine